The Men's 25 km competition of the 2014 European Aquatics Championships was held on 17 August.

Results
The race was started at 09:00.

References

2014 European Aquatics Championships
European Aquatics Championships